Apri in Sanskrit means "conciliation, propitiation" and refers to special invocations spoken previous to the offering of oblations in an animal sacrifice. Some scholars have proposed however, that these hymns were originally meant for a family ritual centered around Agni, which was then later connected to the animal sacrifice.

Aprisuktas

References

 in: Monier-Williams A Sanskrit Dictionary, 1899.
R. Fick, "Gotra" in: ed.  Hastings, Encyclopaedia of Religion and Ethics vol. 6, 1999, p. 355
Samir Nath, "Gotra-system" in: Dictionary Of Vedanta, 2002, p. 153.

Rigveda
Rigvedic deities
Fire in Hindu worship
Gotras